Saint-Seine-l'Abbaye is a commune in the Côte-d'Or department in eastern France.

It is also a place steeped in history with its archaeological sites, the goddess Sequana; nymph Sources close to the Seine and Alesia, the remnants of its ancient abbey (the Abbey of Saint-Seine) and the abbey church, a jewel of Gothic art primitive Burgundy and its rich rural heritage: the 1856 school converted into a museum, flower laundries, foundries, crucifixes, mills.

The abbey was founded by Saint Sequanus in the 6th century.

Population

See also
Communes of the Côte-d'Or department

References

Communes of Côte-d'Or